Thornhill, Nova Scotia  is a residential neighbourhood in Halifax on the Mainland Halifax within the Halifax Regional Municipality Nova Scotia .

References
 Destination Nova Scotia

Communities in Halifax, Nova Scotia